The Caribbean campaign may refer to:

 The West Indies campaign of the American Revolutionary War
 The Central American campaign of the American Revolutionary War